Events from the year 1770 in Denmark.

Incumbents
 Monarch – Christian VII
 Prime minister –  Count Johann Hartwig Ernst von Bernstorff (until 13 September), Johann Friedrich Struensee

Events

 26 March - It is reported that it is possible to walk across the ice from Helsingør to Scania.
 2 May - A Royal Danish Navy fleet bound for Algiers departs from Copenhagen to bomb the city in response to the recurrent pirate attacks in the Mediterranean Sea.

Undated

Births
 2 March - Johan Ernst Hartmann, organist and composer (died 1844)
 2 July - Hans Munk, physician (died 1848)
 September 29 - Jacob Holm, industrialist, ship owner and ship builder (died 1845)
 19 November - Bertel Thorvaldsen, sculptor (died 1844)

Deaths
 27 May – Queen Sophia Magdalene, queen of Denmark (born 1700)
 September 23 – Utilia Lenkiewitz, actress (born 1711)

References

 
1770s in Denmark
Denmark
Years of the 18th century in Denmark